Guidry is a surname. Notable people with the surname include:

Brian Guidry (born 1968), American painter
Carolyn Tyler Guidry (born 1937), American bishop
Dick Guidry (1929–2014), American businessman
Greg G. Guidry (born 1961), American lawyer and jurist
Greg Guidry (1950–2003), American singer
James Guidry (born 1967), American football player
Javelin Guidry (born 1998), American football player
Jesse J. Guidry (c. 1921–1987), American politician
John Michael Guidry (born 1962), American jurist
Mark Guidry (born 1959), American jockey
Mickey Guidry (born 1966), American football player
Paul Guidry (born 1944), American football player
Richard Guidry (1949–2008), American academic
Robert Charles Guidry (1938–2010), known as Bobby Charles, American singer-songwriter.
Ron Guidry (born 1950), American baseball player

See also
Carlette Guidry-White (born 1968), American sprinter